Light of Worlds is the fifth studio album, and seventh album of new material by the American R&B group Kool & the Gang. Released in 1974, it was later remastered by Polygram and was a second success for the band, reaching number 16 in the R&B Charts and number 63 in the Pop Charts. It was a landmark in the funk/jazz fusion genre of the 1970s.

Light of Worlds is regarded as Kool & the Gang's most spiritual and sophisticated work, produced in the wake of the success of their previous album, Wild and Peaceful. While it was their seventh album of original material, the band considered Light of the Worlds their ninth LP (counting two compilations), and therefore consciously chose nine songs for the album to represent the then nine planets in the Solar System. The album contains rock-inspired funk set to jazz-informed playing with afrobeat influences and a tinge of analogue synthesizing.

"Summer Madness" is considered to be the album's highlight, incorporating smooth melodies and a synthesizer. It was later released as a single, with a follow-up titled "Winter Sadness" in Kool & the Gang's Spirit of the Boogie a year later.
In 1991, the Hip-Hop duo DJ Jazzy Jeff & The Fresh Prince sampled elements of "Summer Madness" for their song "Summertime". A remake of "Summer Madness" was released on their 1993 album Unite titled "WKOOL/Summer".

Track listing

Singles

Personnel
Kool & the Gang
 Ronald Bell – arrangements (1, 7, 9), acoustic piano (1, 4–7, 9), clavinet (1, 4, 5, 7), ARP synthesizer (1, 5–9), bass (1), percussion (1), tenor saxophone (1–4, 7, 9), vocals (3, 4, 6, 9), alto flute (5), mellotron (6, 8, 9), ARP 2600 (7), lead vocals (7),  electric piano (9), kalimba (9)
 Robert "Kool" Bell – bass (1–8), vocals (6, 7)
 George "Funky" Brown – drums (1–9),  percussion (1, 9), vocals (6), kettle drums (9), gong (9)
 Robert "Spike" Mickens – trumpet (1, 2, 3, 5, 7), flugelhorn (2), vocals (6), arrangements (6, 8)
 Claydes Charles Smith – guitar (1–8), vibraphone (4), percussion (4), arrangements (4), conductor (4)
 Ricky West – acoustic piano (1, 2, 7, 8), lead vocals (2), arrangements (2), electric piano (5)
 Dennis "D.T." Thomas – alto saxophone (1, 2, 3, 7), clavinet (3), congas (3), percussion (3, 5), lead vocals (3), arrangements (3)

Additional personnel
 Herb Lane – vocals (4), backing vocals (7)
 Alton Taylor – vocals (4), lead vocals (6)
 Penni Phynjuar Saunders – vocals (3, 4)
 Richard Shade – backing vocals (7)
 Kenneth Banks – backing vocals (7)
 Al Pazant – trumpet (4)
 Ed Pazant – oboe (4), alto saxophone (4)
 Noel Pointer – strings (4)

Production
 Producers – Kool & The Gang
 Engineers – Bob Clearmountain, Godfrey Diamond, Harvey Goldberg and Alec Head.
 Cover Design – Frank Daniel 
 Liner Notes – Cleveland "Clevie" Browne
 Photography – Bernie Block, David Lartaud and Phil Willen.
Reissue 
 Digital Remastering – Gary N. Mayo
 Package – Mitchell Kanner
 Liner Notes – Cleveland "Clevie" Browne

Certifications

Notes

References

External links
 Light of Worlds at Discogs

Kool & the Gang albums
1974 albums
De-Lite Records albums
Jazz-funk albums